Madibira is an administrative ward in the Mbarali district of the Mbeya Region of Tanzania. In 2016 the Tanzania National Bureau of Statistics report there were 27,269 people in the ward, from 24,742 in 2012.

Villages and hamlets 
The ward has 6 villages, and 39 hamlets.

 Iheha
 Ikulu
 Kinyangulu
 Mbuyuni
 Mheza
 Mji mwema
 Ikoga
 Amani
 Ikulu
 Madawi
 Magunguli
 Magunguli-Lutherani
 Mahango-Madibira
 Majengo
 Mapinduzi
 Mbuyuni
 Mtakuja
 Chalisuka
 Chalisuka
 Godown
 Mbuyuni
 Mikoroshini
 Upendo
 Mkunywa
 Kabete
 Kanamalenga
 Kichangani
 Lingondime
 Mazombe
 Mkunywa 'A'
 Mkunywa 'B'
 Mlonga
 Mlwasi
 Nyakadete
 Mtibwa
 Muungano
 Nyakadete
 Saligona
 Ubagule
 Nyamakuyu
 Ikulu
 Mbuyuni
 Miembeni
 Unyanyembe A
 Unyanyembe B

References 

Wards of Mbeya Region